Cheshmeh Gol (also Romanized as Chashmeh Gol; also known as Ma’dan-e-Cheshmeh Gol) is a village in Jamrud Rural District, in the Central District of Torbat-e Jam County, Razavi Khorasan Province, Iran. At the 2006 census, its population was 1,284, in 303 families.

References 

Populated places in Torbat-e Jam County